Don Fumino is an Italian sitcom.

Cast
 Renzo Montagnani: Don Fumino
 Pippo Santonastaso:  De Lollis
 Isa Gallinelli: Bianca
 Luisa Rovati: Valentina
 Luisella Boni: The Countess

See also
List of Italian television series

External links
 

Italian television series
RAI original programming

1993 Italian television series debuts